The 2002–03 EuroCup Women was the first edition of FIBA Europe's second-tier international competition for women's basketball clubs under such name.

Regional qualifying round

Conference North

Group A

Group B

Group C

Group D

Conference West

Group A

Group B

Group C

Group D

Conference South

Group A

Group B

Group C

Group D

Group E

Group F

Paneuropean phase

Qualifying round

Group A

Group B

Group C

Group D

Play-offs

|}

Final Four

Semifinals

|}

Third place game

|}

Final

|}

See also
 2002–23 EuroLeague Women

External links
 EuroCup Women website

EuroCup Women seasons
2002–03 in European women's basketball leagues